Albert Burrows (February 20, 1837 – April 30, 1896) was an American politician in the state of Washington. He served in the Washington House of Representatives from 1895 to 1896.

References

Republican Party members of the Washington House of Representatives
1837 births
1896 deaths
People from Morgan County, Indiana
19th-century American politicians